Niagara, Niagara is a 1997 film directed by Bob Gosse, and starring Henry Thomas, Robin Tunney, as well as Michael Parks, John Ventimiglia and Stephen Lang.

A dark and tragic romantic tale about young love, drugs, a cross country trip and Tourette syndrome. Filmed locations were New Paltz, Highland and Poughkeepsie in upstate New York, as well as Niagara Falls and Canada. The film was produced by the New York City based Shooting Gallery.

The film was praised internationally, particularly in the UK, but American critics were mixed. Robin Tunney's performance garnered her the Volpi Cup Award for Best Actress at the 1997 Venice International Film Festival. The film has fallen into a cult status, due to underground popularity.

Plot

The film begins with Seth and Marcie shoplifting items from a dollar type store. The two crooks crash into each other and soon a friendship ensues. After giving Marcie a ride to her weekend job, Seth goes home to his abusive and somewhat mentally unstable father.

The next day Seth is at a different store where he runs into Marcie. After driving over to her home and picking up some of Marcie’s personal items, they begin a drive north to Canada in pursuit of a black Barbie styling head for Marcie.

On their drive north, Marcie is unable to hide her tics. At one point, she has an outburst in a parking lot and attacks a guy who was shouting insults to Seth. From this point on, the only things that keep her tics and behaviors at bay are sex and alcohol.

In desperation to get her hands on an antipsychotic, they attempt to rob a pharmacy. The pharmacist catches them and shoots Seth in the leg with a shot gun. The two get away, but one of the car tires is hit in the process and eventually Marcie crashes the car.

An old man named Walter tows their truck to his place and helps take care of Seth’s wound. Over the course of a week, he teaches the two how to shoot and catch fish.

After a local deputy comes by asking Walter if he’d seen the pair, Marcie has a severe outburst and beats Walter. Seth and Marcie take off in Walter’s truck.

The pair make it to Canada and find the Barbie head. The only available black Barbie head is a display model that the store manager refuses to sell. Marcie again has a violent outburst and the cops are called. When the police arrive, she grabs the gun from one police officer and the other surprises her from a side aisle and shoots her dead. Seth is arrested.

Later, we see Walter reading an apologies letter with $20 from Seth. Seth narrates the happy ending that did not happen, as Walter reads his letter.

Cast
Henry Thomas as Seth
Robin Tunney as Marcy
Michael Parks as Walter
Stephen Lang as Claude
Candy Clark as Sally
John Ventimiglia as Doug (Drug Store Owner)
Clea DuVall as Convenience Store Hostage
Shawn Hatosy as Parking Lot Teen
Justin Salsberg as Parking Lot Teen (cameo)
Jonathan Wong as Onlooker, Crowd Member

External links

1997 films
1990s drama road movies
American drama road movies
Films directed by Bob Gosse
1990s English-language films
1997 drama films
1990s American films
Films about Tourette syndrome